The Detroit Lightning was a Major Indoor Soccer League franchise which existed for only one season, 1979–1980.  The Lightning finished that season at 15–17.  The team's home arena was Cobo Arena.

On May 28, 1980, at the end of the 1979–1980 season, David Schoenstadt bought the Lightning and moved the team from Detroit, Michigan to San Francisco, California where he renamed the team the San Francisco Fog.

Owners
 Norman Lear
 Jerry Perenchio

Staff
 Lynne Saunders – President / General Manager
 Klaas de Boer – Assistant Coach
 Jack Nida - Operations Assistant

Record

Honors
First Team All MISL
 1979–1980 Flemming Lund

References

L
Soccer clubs in Michigan
Defunct indoor soccer clubs in the United States
Major Indoor Soccer League (1978–1992) teams
1979 establishments in Michigan
1980 disestablishments in Michigan
Association football clubs established in 1979
Association football clubs disestablished in 1980